The 2015 Missouri Tigers football team (also called "Mizzou") represented the University of Missouri in the 2015 NCAA Division I FBS football season. It marked the Tigers' fourth season as a member of the Southeastern Conference (SEC) in the Eastern Division. The team played its home games at Faurot Field in Columbia, Missouri. They were led by 15th year head coach Gary Pinkel, in what would be his last season as the team's head coach.

Recruits

Schedule
Missouri announced their 2015 football schedule on October 14, 2014. The 2015 schedule consist of 6 home games, 5 away games and 1 neutral game in the regular season. The Tigers will host SEC foes Florida, Mississippi State, South Carolina, and Tennessee, and will travel to Arkansas, Georgia, Kentucky, and Vanderbilt.

Missouri will host Mississippi State for the first time since 1984, when the Tigers were playing in the Big Eight Conference, before joining the SEC 28 years later. That match–up against the Bulldogs will be the third Thursday night game hosted by Missouri in Tiger history. This will be the Tigers' first year without Texas A&M on their schedule since 2009, and the first year without any team from Texas on its schedule since 1984.

At the release of the 2015 schedule, Missouri was the only member in the SEC to not complete their entire schedule as the Tigers were still finalizing the game to be played on November 14. One month later after releasing of their schedule, Missouri announced that the game on November 14 would be played against BYU at Arrowhead Stadium in Kansas City.

Schedule Source:

Rankings

NFL Draft

Campus protests and resignation of Tim Wolfe

In the fall of 2015 there were a number of racially charged incidents at the University of Missouri campus.  Some students held protests, and some called for the resignation of university system president Tim Wolfe, who they said had not provided a sufficient response to the incidents.  On November 7 some members of the Missouri Tigers football team said that they would boycott all football-related activities until Wolfe resigned. Coach Pinkel stated that he supported the players. On November 9 Wolfe resigned as president.

References

Missouri
Missouri Tigers football seasons
Missouri Tigers football